Deportivo Mictlán is a Guatemalan football club, playing in the top division again in the 2010 Clausura tournament.

Nicknamed Los Conejos (the Rabbits) and based in Asunción Mita, Jutiapa, their home stadium is Estadio La Asunción, which holds 3,000.

History
Mictlán was promoted for the first time in 1992 when they bought the license that Galcasa from Villa Nueva left in the top division. In 2006 Mictlán achieved their second promotion to the Liga Nacional when they defeated Xinabajul in Primera División de Ascenso extra match, playing the 2006–2007 season in Liga Nacional for the first time since 1996. They would be back in the Second Division soon again after finishing last in the overall standings, thus being automatically demoted and stay there through the 2009–2010 season .

The team returned to Guatemala's top division for the 2010 Clausura tournament after defeating Sacachispas 1–0 in overtime.

First-team squad

Current Coaching Staff
As of June 24, 2021.

Board of directors
As of June 25, 2010.

Club Statistics and Records
Biggest win achieved: 6–1 to Juventud Retalteca (1993–94 League).
Embedded biggest win: 6–1 from Comunicaciones (1994–95 League).
Best League position: 3rd. (1995)
Top scorer: Rudy Rolando Ramírez (18 goals)

List of coaches
 Jhonny Chávez

References

Mictlan